Donna Smelser Howard (born October 25, 1951) is a Democratic member of the Texas House of Representatives, representing the 48th District since her election in 2006. She currently serves as vice chair of the House Administration Committee and also serves on the Appropriations Committee, the Higher Education Committee, and the Appropriations Sub-Committees on Article III and on Budget Transparency and Reform.

Early life, education, and early career 
Howard was born in Austin, Texas. She graduated from Reagan High School in Austin before moving on to the University of Texas at Austin, where she earned a B.A in Nursing in 1974 and an M.A. in Health Administration in 1977.

Howard worked as a critical-care nurse at Brackenrige Hospital and Seton Hospital in Austin. While at Seton, she helped start the Good Health program and served as District 5 President of the Texas Nurse's Association. Howard also served on the University of Texas faculty as a Health Education instructor.

Political career 
From 1996-1999, Howard served on the Eanes Independent School District school board.

On February 14, 2006, Howard defeated Republican Ben Bentzin in a special election runoff to replace Todd Baxter.

In the 2006 general election, Howard was again to face Bentzin, but Bentzin ultimately withdrew from the race, which Howard won by a wide margin.

Howard retained her seat in 2008, defeating Republican Pamela Waggoner.

In 2009, the Texas Association of Deans and Directors of Professional Nursing Programs honored Howard with its Champion for Nursing Education Award.

In 2010, Howard narrowly defeated former Texas Longhorn and Denver Broncos player Dan Neil. On election day, the Secretary of State of Texas certified Howard as the winner by 16 votes. Following a recount requested by Neil, the Secretary of State found Howard to still be the winner, though by only 12 votes. Neil then requested that the election be investigated by the House of Representatives. After a four-day hearing headed up by Representative Will Hartnett, Howard was found to have won the election by 4 votes and Neil ultimately dropped the contest.

In 2011, Howard was the recipient of the 2011 Dr. Dorothy J. Lovett Distinguished Alumni Award from the University of Texas School of Nursing and was inducted in the University of Texas College of Education Hall of Honor.

In 2019, Howard authored H.B. 1590, which created a Sexual Assault Survivors Task Force in the Governor’s Office to collect information on agencies' responses to sexual assaults and develop best practices. The bill passed unanimously in the House and Senate and was signed by the Governor. The Task Force began meeting on February 6, 2020, and is due to deliver a series of reports to the Texas Legislature on November 1, 2020.

Texas Monthly named Howard a Best Lawmaker in June 2019 for her work during Texas' 86th Legislative session.

Election history
Election history of Howard.

Most recent election

2018

Previous elections

2016

2014

2012

2010

2008

2006

External links

Donna Howard Official TX House website
Donna Howard '''Official website
Project Vote Smart - Representative Donna Howard (TX) profile

References

University of Texas Health Science Center at San Antonio alumni
1951 births
Living people
People from Austin, Texas
Democratic Party members of the Texas House of Representatives
Women state legislators in Texas
American nurses
American women nurses
21st-century American politicians
21st-century American women politicians